Fort Portal Airport  is a civilian airport in Uganda. The airport is close to the foothills of the Rwenzori Mountains. The airport serves Fort Portal and Kibale National Park, receiving flights from Kajjansi Airfield and Murchison Falls National Park.

The airport is privately operated by Christian missionary/pilot Jeff Cash. The Churches of Christ and Where He Leads, Inc. help maintain the airstrip. HUFP has also been registered under the owner's name of Jeff Cash.

See also

List of airports in Uganda
Transport in Uganda

References

External links
OpenStreetMap - Fort Portal Airport

Fort Portal Airport

Airports in Uganda
Kabarole District